Plectoptilus is a genus of spiders in the family Oonopidae. It was first described in 1905 by Simon. , it contains only one species, Plectoptilus myops, found on Java.

References

Oonopidae
Monotypic Araneomorphae genera
Spiders of Asia